, also known by his Chinese style name , was a prince of Ryukyu Kingdom.

Prince Misato was the fourth son of King Shō Tei. His mother was Makabe Aji-ganashi, the successor consort of King Shō Tei, so he was also a full-brother of Prince Oroku Chōki. He was the originator of royal family Ōgimi Udun.

Prince Misato was dispatched together with Tomimori Seifu (also known by Ishadō Seifu) in 1710 to celebrate Tokugawa Ienobu succeeded as shōgun of the Tokugawa shogunate. They sailed back in the next year.

He buried in Makabi grave. Prince Yonagusuku Chōchoku (also known by Shō Kan ) was dispatched to Kagoshima in place of him.

Prince Misato had no heir, and adopted Misato Chōkō, the second son of his brother Oroku Chōki, as his adopted son.

References

|-

1682 births
1711 deaths
Princes of Ryūkyū
People of the Ryukyu Kingdom
Ryukyuan people
Deaths due to shipwreck at sea
17th-century Ryukyuan people
18th-century Ryukyuan people